Avidan is a surname of Hebrew origin. Notable people with this surname include:

 Asaf Avidan (born 1980), Israeli singer-songwriter and musician.
 Dan Avidan (born 1979), American musician, Internet personality, singer-songwriter and comedian of Israeli descent.
 David Avidan (1934–1995), Israeli poet, painter, filmmaker, publicist, and playwright.
 Shimon Avidan (1911–1994), Israeli soldier and officer, commander of the Givati Brigade during the 1948 Arab–Israeli War.

References 

Hebrew-language surnames